Daku Rani Ganga is a 1976 Gujarati film, based on a Gujarati novel Pravah Paltayo  written by Harkisan Mehta. The film was produced by his son Tushar Mehta. It was also dubbed and released as a Bhojpuri film, directed by Marathi film director Datta Keshav.

Cast

 Ragini Shah
 Urmila Bhatt	
 Kishore Jariwala 
 Arvind Joshi	
 Arvind Pandya

Soundtrack

References

External links

1970s Gujarati-language films
1976 films